CFBDSIR J145829+101343 (designation abbreviated to CFBDSIR 1458+10, or CFBDSIR J1458+1013) is a binary system of two brown dwarfs of spectral classes T9 + Y0 orbiting each other, located in constellation Boötes about 104 light-years away from Earth.

The smaller companion, CFBDSIR 1458+10B, has a surface temperature of approx 370 K (≈100 °C), which is only about as hot as a cup of coffee. It used to be known as the coolest known brown dwarf until the discovery of WISE 1828+2650 in August 2011.

Discovery
CFBDSIR 1458+10 A was discovered in 2010 by Delorme et al. from the Canada-France Brown Dwarf Survey using the facilities MegaCam and  mounted on the 3.6 m Canada-France-Hawaii Telescope, located on Mauna Kea Observatory, Hawaii. Image in z` band was taken on 2004 July 15 with MegaCam, and image in J band was taken on 2007 April 1 with WIRCam. In 2009 they made follow-up photometry, using the SOFI near infrared camera at the ESO 3.5 m New Technology Telescope (NTT) at the La Silla Observatory, Chile. In 2010 Delorme et al. published a paper in Astronomy and Astrophysics where they reported the identification of 55 T-dwarfs candidates, six of which were photometrically confirmed as T-dwarfs, including 3 ultracool brown dwarfs (later than T7 dwarfs and possible Y dwarfs), including CFBDSIR 1458+10.

Discovery of B
CFBDSIR 1458+10 B was discovered in 2011 by Liu et al. with laser guide star (LGS) adaptive optics (AO) system of the 10 m Keck II Telescope on Mauna Kea, Hawaii, using infra-red camera NIRC2 (the observations were made on 2010 May 22 and 2010 July 8 (UT)). In 2011 Liu et al. published a paper in The Astrophysical Journal where they presented discovery of CFBDSIR 1458+10 system component B (the only discovery presented in the article). Also they presented a near-infrared (J-band) trigonometric parallax of the system, measured using WIRCam on the Canada-France-Hawaii Telescope (CFHT), Mauna Kea, in seven epochs during the 2009–2010; and spectroscopy with the X-Shooter spectrograph at the European Southern Observatory's Very Large Telescope (VLT) Unit Telescope 2 (UT2) in Chile (the observations have been performed from May 5 to July 9, 2010), that allowed to calculate the temperature (and other physical parameters) of the two brown dwarfs.

2012 Keck LGS-AO imaging
In 2012 CFBDSIR 1458+10 system was observed by Liu et al. with laser guide star (LGS) adaptive optics (AO) system of the 10 m Keck II Telescope on Mauna Kea, Hawaii, using infra-red camera NIRC2 (the observations were made on 2012 April 13 (UT)). In 2012 Liu et al. published a paper in The Astrophysical Journal where they presented results of observations with Keck II LGS-AO of three brown dwarf binary systems, binarity of the two of which was first presented in this paper, and binarity of the other one, CFBDSIR 1458+10, was known before.

Distance
Trigonometric parallax of CFBDSIR 1458+10, measured under The Hawaii Infrared Parallax Program by Dupuy & Liu in 2012, is 31.3 ± 2.5 mas, corresponding to a distance 31.9 pc, or 104.2 ly.

CFBDSIR 1458+10 distance estimates

Space motion
CFBDSIR 1458+10 has proper motion of about 420 milliarcseconds per year.

CFBDSIR 1458+10 proper motion estimates

Physical properties
Using three models, Liu et al. calculated physical properties of CFBDSIR 1458+10 components.

From Lyon/COND models and Lbol:

From Burrows et al. (1997) models and Lbol):

From Burrows et al. (2003) models and M(J):

The adopted surface temperature of B is 370 ± 40 K, and adopted mass is 6-15 MJup.

Luminosity
At the time of its discovery, CFBDSIR 1458+10 B was the least luminous brown dwarf known.

CFBDSIR 1458+10 bolometric luminosity estimates

B's spectral class
In Liu et al. (2011) CFBDSIR 1458+10 B was assigned to the spectral class >T10, it was proposed that CFBDSIR 1458+10 B may be a member of the Y spectral class of brown dwarfs. In 2012 Liu et al. assigned it a spectral class Y0.

Water clouds
Due to the low surface temperature for a brown dwarf, CFBDSIR 1458+10 B may be able to form water clouds in its upper atmosphere.

See also
The other two brown dwarf binary systems, observed by Liu et al. with Keck II LGS-AO in 2012:
WISE 1217+1626 (T9 + Y0, binarity was newly discovered)
WISE 1711+3500 (T8 + T9.5, binarity was newly discovered)

Notes

References

External links
 CFBDSIR 1458+10 (Solstation.com)

Astronomical objects discovered in 2010
Binary stars
Brown dwarfs
Boötes
T-type stars
Y-type stars
CFBDS objects
WISE objects